Parviz Baghirov (born 10 February 1994) is an Azerbaijani boxer. He competed in the men's welterweight event at the 2016 Summer Olympics.

References

External links
 
 
 
 

1994 births
Living people
Azerbaijani male boxers
Olympic boxers of Azerbaijan
Boxers at the 2016 Summer Olympics
Sportspeople from Baku
Boxers at the 2015 European Games
European Games medalists in boxing
European Games gold medalists for Azerbaijan
AIBA World Boxing Championships medalists
Welterweight boxers
20th-century Azerbaijani people
21st-century Azerbaijani people